The 1984 European Parliament election in Greenland was the election of the delegation from the constituent country Greenland of the Kingdom of Denmark to the European Parliament in 1984. This is the last election that Greenland partook in prior to the secession of Greenland from the European Union in 1985.

Results

See also
1984 European Parliament election in Denmark
Greenland (European Parliament constituency)

References
 Archivo electoral de la Generalidad Valenciana

Greenland
European Parliament elections in Greenland
Elections in Greenland
1984 in Greenland